The 12th Kazakhstan President Cup was played from August 24 to August 28, 2019 in Nur-Sultan. 6 youth teams participated in the tournament (players were born no earlier than 2003.)

Participants

Venues 
All matches took place at House of Football in Nur-Sultan.

Format 
The tournament is held in two stages. At the first stage, six teams are divided into two qualification groups (A and B). Competitions of the first stage were held on a circular system. The winners of the groups advance to the final, while the group runners-up meet to determine third place.

Squads

Group stage
All times UTC+6

Group A

Group B

Match for 5th place

Bronze medal match

Final

Statistics

Goalscorers 

6 goals
  Armandas Kučys(1 pen.)

4 goals
  Galymzhan Kenzhebek

2 goals
  Artur Serobyan
  Levon Vardanyan
  Abzal Kalau
  Alisher Rakhimzhanov(1 pen.)
  Arsen Azatov
  Danil Ankudinov

1 goal
  Yuri Kolozyan
  Askar Satyshev
  Daniyar Dulatov
  Kudaiberdy Narkulov
  Murodzhan Khalmatov
  Roman Chirkov
  Vadim Yakovlev
  Vladislav Kravchenko
  Yryskeldi Tynybekov
  Gvidas Gineitis
  Matas Gasiunas
  Nedas Simkutis
  Mudzhovid Shovaysudinov
  Muhammadvoris Saydaliev
  Rahmatshoh Rahmadzoda
  Sunatullo Azizov

Awards 

The best player of a tournament
 Galymzhan Kenzhebek
Goalscorer of a tournament
 Armandas Kučys (6 goals)
The best goalkeeper of a tournament
 Temirlan Anarbekov
The best defender of a tournament
 Aleksandr Shirobokov 
The best midfielder of a tournament
 Ayni Alidzhoni
The best forward of a tournament
 Yuri Kolozyan

Prize money 
According to FFK, the prize fund of a tournament will make $15,000. "The teams which took 1, 2 and 3 place will be received, respectively 7,000, 5,000 and 3,000 $.

References

Kazakhstan President Cup (football)
2019 in Kazakhstani football
2019 in youth association football